Zaki Osman may refer to:

 Zaki Osman (footballer, born 1898)
 Zaki Osman (footballer, born 1932)